Coahuitlán is a municipality in Veracruz, Mexico.

Coahuitlán is delimited to the north and to the east by Coyutla, to the south-east by Chumatlan, to the south by Filomeno Mata and to the west by Puebla State.

Due to the weather, which is warm all year and rains in summer, the main production is of maize and beans.

In Coahuitlán, in March and April, a celebration in honor of Santo Entierro takes place.

References

External links 
  Municipal Official webpage
  Municipal Official Information

Municipalities of Veracruz